Bursledon Windmill is a Grade II* listed windmill in Bursledon, Hampshire, England which has been restored to working order.

Description

Bursledon mill is a five-storey tower mill with a reefing stage at first floor level. The boat shaped cap is winded by a chain and wheel. The four Common sails are carried on a wooden windshaft, which also carries the wooden brake wheel. This drives the wooden wallower, located at the top of the wooden upright shaft. The wooden great spur wheel at the bottom of the upright shaft drives three pairs of underdrift millstones.

Commercial history

Bursledon Windmill was built in 1814 by a Mrs Phoebe Langtry, replacing an earlier post mill which was built about 1768.  The machinery of the earlier mill was incorporated into the new mill. In 1814, the mill was mortgaged for £800 for six years. The mill was sold by the mortgagees in 1820. The mill was working until the 1880s initially by Mrs Langtry's son, Wiliam Langtry. John Cove and his family worked this mill between 1847 and 1871. The UK census shows he had worked a mill in Portsmouth and originally came from Wiltshire. He and his wife Susannah Emmett both came from Wiltshire and are responsible for the nearly all the Cove family in Southampton. His daughter Mary married a Jarvis and  ran the Jolly Sailor public house in Hamble, one of his other daughters ran a market garden at the end of Windmill Lane and his son John Cove  became a farm labourer. The last miller was George Gosling who bought the mill in 1872.

Decline of the windmill

When the mill ceased working, a flat roof was placed on the cap frame, which preserved the machinery in the mill.
In 1931, the runner stones were removed. The mill was derelict by 1978, the top two floors being in very poor condition by then. Some essential repairs were carried out in that year by the County Council.

Restoration of the windmill

Between 1978 and 1991, the mill was restored by the Hampshire Buildings Preservation Trust. The sails were replaced in 1990 and the mill opened to the public in May 1991.

Ongoing maintenance of the windmill

In February 2012, the start of a major restoration to the windmill began. The first stage saw the removal of the wooden lattices that make up the sails. This work was in preparation for the replacement of the windshaft which had reached the end of its natural life. The work was completed in November 2014.

In 2014 ownership of the Bursledon Windmill was transferred to the Hampshire Cultural Trust as part of a larger transfer of museums from Hampshire County Council and Winchester City Council.

Millers
William Langtry 1787–1813 (post mill)
William Langtry 1814–1820 (son of the above)
John Cove 1847–1871
George Gosling 1872–1907

Public access

Bursledon Windmill is open to the public from 11:00 to 16:00 on Sundays. It is also open by appointment on Tuesdays and Wednesdays.

References

External links

Bursledon Windmill - Hampshire County Council
Windmill World webpage on Bursledon Mill.
Diagram of Bursledon Mill

Windmills completed in 1814
Grade II* listed buildings in Hampshire
Grade II* listed windmills
Grinding mills in the United Kingdom
Tower mills in the United Kingdom
Museums in Hampshire
Windmills in Hampshire
Mill museums in England